Sylvaine is the solo music project of Norwegian metal multi-instrumentalist Katherine Shepard. The project began in Oslo in 2013 and has released four albums to date. In 2019, Shepard became the first woman to earn a nomination for best metal album at the Norwegian Grammy Awards.

History 
Shepard was born in San Diego, California in the United States in 1991 to a Norwegian mother and an American father before her family moved to Oslo at a young age. She is a classically trained vocalist and received a bachelor's degree in musicology from the University of Oslo. The project's name Sylvaine was inspired by the word "sylvan" (meaning forest, woods) and the surname of French poet Paul Verlaine.

Shepard self-released her first album Silent Chamber, Noisy Heart in 2014 after writing it in Oslo from late 2012 to early 2013. She moved to Paris, France to write her second album Wistful, which was released in 2016 on the label Season of Mist. Alcest bandleader Neige played the drums on Wistful. Shepard met Neige after an Alcest concert in 2012 and toured with Alcest in 2014.

The third Sylvaine album Atoms Aligned, Coming Undone was released on 2 November 2018 and was preceded by the singles "Abeyance", "Mørklagt" and "L’Appel Du Vide". Neige also played the drums on the record. Atoms Aligned, Coming Undone was nominated for a Norweign Grammy Award for best metal album, with Shepard becoming the first female musician to earn a nomination in that category.

In 2018, Shepard released the split EP Time Without End in collaboration with post-black metal artist Unreqvited. The next year, she provided guest vocals on the song "L’île des morts" from Alcest's sixth album Spiritual Instinct.

Sylvaine's fourth album Nova was released in 2022.

Shepard is a multi-instrumentalist who can play guitar, bass, piano and synthesiser. Her influences as a guitarist include Slowdive's Neil Halstead and Explosions in the Sky.

Discography

Studio albums 

 Silent Chamber, Noisy Heart (2014)
 Wistful (2016)
 Atoms Aligned, Coming Undone (2018)
 Nova (2022)

EPs 
 Time Without End (with Unreqvited) (2020)

As a guest 
 Background vocals on Alcest's Kodama (2016) and L’île des morts (2019)
 Vocals on ISON's Meridian (2021)
 Vocals on MØL's Diorama (2021)
 Vocals on Carpenter Brut's Stabat Mater (2022)

References 

Norwegian black metal musical groups
Musical groups established in 2013
Musical groups from Oslo
One-man bands